Rhagades are fissures, cracks, or linear scars in the skin, especially at the angles of the mouth and nose. They tend to form at areas of motion. They can be a result from bacterial infection of skin lesions. They are associated with late stages of congenital syphilis.

This is one of the late stage manifestations of congenital syphilis, others are saber shins, Hutchinson teeth, saddle nose, and Clutton's joints (usually knee synovitis).

See also
Angular cheilitis
Anal fissure

References

Cutaneous congenital anomalies